Pleurella is a genus of fungi in the family Tricholomataceae. This is a monotypic genus, containing the single species Pleurella ardesiaca, found in New Zealand.

See also

 List of Tricholomataceae genera

References

Fungi of New Zealand
Tricholomataceae
Monotypic Agaricales genera